Princess Charlotte of Prussia (21 June 1831 – 30 March 1855) was by birth a Princess of Prussia and member of the House of Hohenzollern. By marriage she became Hereditary Princess of Saxe-Meiningen.

Life

Family and early years

Her parents' marriage was unhappy due to Prince Albert's several affairs, and finally was dissolved on 28 March 1849, after which Princess Marianne began to live with her former coachman Johannes van Rossum, with whom she had a son, Johannes William of Reinhartshausen.

The custody of Charlotte and her two surviving siblings Albert and Alexandrine was given to their father; however, their childless aunt Queen Elisabeth Ludovika took care of them, moreover after Prince Albert's second and morganatic marriage in 1853 with Rosalie von Rauch, who bore him two sons, Count William and Count Frederick of Hohenau.

Marriage
As a young woman, Charlotte was highly eligible, due to her Dutch fortune and Hohenzollern connections. In Charlottenburg on 18 May 1850, the nineteen-year-old princess married Georg, Hereditary Prince of Saxe-Meiningen, who was twenty-four years old. The only son of Bernhard II, Duke of Saxe-Meiningen and Princess Marie of Hesse-Kassel, he had led a battalion from Meiningen in support of the Prussians in the First Schleswig War in 1849. After resuming his military career in Berlin, Georg soon became engaged to Charlotte, whose position as a niece of Frederick William IV of Prussia surely recommended her to him. It was a love match and their marriage occurred after a short engagement. Among the wedding gifts was an opulent old villa on Lake Como from her mother Marianne, as well as a substantial collection of paintings and sculptures. It was renamed the Villa Carlotta in the bride's honour. Due to their Prussian connections, the couple spent the next five years in Berlin and Potsdam but returned to Meiningen for the birth of their children.

The two shared many interests, particularly with the theatre, as they were both ardent attendees; during their engagement, they had even acted in amateur court theatricals together. They had four children. Charlotte had a talent for music, and was taught by the likes of Wilhelm Taubert, Theodor Kullak and Julius Stern in her youth. She wrote a number of military marches, songs and piano pieces. Her daughter, Princess Marie Elisabeth, would inherit these interests.

Death
On 27 January 1855, their second son, Georg died. Charlotte followed him two months later, dying of childbirth complications on 30 March at the age of twenty-three. Georg was inconsolable, but would eventually remarry to Princess Feodora of Hohenlohe-Langenburg in order to provide a mother to his remaining children. He succeeded his father as Duke of Saxe-Meiningen in 1866, ten years after Charlotte's death.

Issue

 Bernhard III, Duke of Saxe-Meiningen (1 April 1851 - 16 January 1928); married Princess Charlotte of Prussia and had issue.
 Prince Georg Albrecht (12 April 1852 - 27 January 1855); died in infancy.
 Princess Marie Elisabeth (23 September 1853 - 22 February 1923); died unmarried.
 An unnamed son (29 March 1855 - 30 March 1855).

Ancestry

References

Works cited

1831 births
1855 deaths
Deaths in childbirth
House of Hohenzollern
Prussian princesses
House of Saxe-Meiningen
Princesses of Saxe-Meiningen
People from Berlin
19th-century Prussian people
19th-century Prussian women